Wagtmans is a Dutch surname. Notable people with the surname include:

Rini Wagtmans (born 1946), Dutch cyclist
Wout Wagtmans (1929–1994), Dutch cyclist, uncle of Rini 

Dutch-language surnames